The 1973 South African Grand Prix, formally titled the Seventh AA Grand Prix of South Africa, was a Formula One motor race held at Kyalami on 3 March 1973. It was race 3 of 15 in both the 1973 World Championship of Drivers and the 1973 International Cup for Formula One Manufacturers. The race was won by Jackie Stewart driving a Tyrrell. Denny Hulme's pole position was the only one of his Formula One World Championship career.

This race marked Scuderia Ferrari's 200th start in a World Championship event as a team.

Accident
Mike Hailwood was recognised for bravery when he went to pull Clay Regazzoni from his burning car after the two collided on the third lap of the race. Hailwood's driving suit caught fire, but after being extinguished by a fire marshal he returned to help rescue Regazzoni, an act for which he was awarded the George Medal.

Classification

Qualifying

Race

Championship standings after the race

Drivers' Championship standings

Constructors' Championship standings

Note: Only the top five positions are included for both sets of standings.

References

South African Grand Prix
Grand Prix
South African Grand Prix
March 1973 sports events in Africa